Loice Jepkoisgei (born ) is a Kenyan female volleyball player. 

With her club Kenya Prisons she competed at the 2011 and 2012 FIVB Volleyball Women's Club World Championship.

References

External links
 profile at FIVB.org

1989 births
Living people
Kenyan women's volleyball players
Place of birth missing (living people)